Maranville is a commune in the Haute-Marne department in north-eastern France.

Geography
The Aujon flows northwestward through the middle of the commune.

See also
Communes of the Haute-Marne department

References

Communes of Haute-Marne